The 1897 Miami Redskins football team was an American football team that represented Miami University during the 1897 college football season. Under new head coach Herbert J. McIntire, Miami compiled a 2–4–1 record.

Schedule

References

Miami
Miami RedHawks football seasons
Miami Redskins football